Salomonia may refer to:
 Salomonia (bug), a genus of insects in the family Aphrophoridae
 Salomonia (plant), a genus of plants in the family Polygalaceae
 Salomonia, a genus of plants in the family Asparagaceae; synonym of Polygonatum